Pi Boötis, Latinized from π Boötis, is a probable triple star system in the northern constellation of Boötes. It is visible to the naked eye with a combined apparent visual magnitude of 4.50. Based upon an annual parallax shift of 10.67 mas as seen from Earth, it is located roughly 310 light years from the Sun.

It is a chemically peculiar star of the HgMn type, with a spectrum that displays anomalous overabundances of mercury, manganese, and silicon. This component is most likely a single-lined spectroscopic binary with an unknown companion. The odds that is a mere chance alignment is 0.85%.

Pi Boötis has the Chinese traditional star name 左攝提二 (Zuǒ shè tí èr)

References

External links
 
 HR 5475
 CCDM J14407+1625
 Image Pi Boötis

B-type giants
A-type main-sequence stars
Double stars
Triple stars
Boötes
Bootis, Pi
BD+17 2768
Bootis, 29
129174
071762
5745
Mercury-manganese stars